Mal Aqa (also Romanized as Māl Āqā; also known as Mālāgha) is a village in Qaleh Tall Rural District, in the Central District of Bagh-e Malek County, Khuzestan Province, Iran. At the 2006 census, its population was 128, in 31 families.

References 

ایران

ایران

Populated places in Bagh-e Malek County